XEXX-AM ("PSN Radio Tecate") is a commercial radio station on 1420 AM in Tijuana, Baja California, Mexico, broadcasting to the San Diego–Tijuana radio market. The station is owned by Grupo Audiorama and operated by Primer Sistema de Noticias. The station simulcasts PSN Radio Tecate programs also aired on XESS-AM 620.

History
The original XEXX concession was awarded to Operadora de Radio y Televisión, S.A., in 1946. In the 1950s, the station was owned by Jose J. Clark and was powered at 2,000 watts. The daytime power was boosted in the early 2000s to 10,000 watts, allowing XEXX to cover Tijuana's sprawling suburbs and much of San Diego during daylight hours. Prior programming included Red W Interactiva and Radio Fórmula. 

In 2018, PSN began operating XEXX, though primarily simulcasting other PSN-owned stations. Under Audiorama operation, it was "Vida" and broadcast a Spanish-language oldies and soft adult contemporary radio format. With the PSN operation, the station broadcast the complete programming of ESPN Deportes Radio (in XESS it was partial) with a newscast in the morning produced by the owner Grupo Audiorama. Following the end of ESPN Deportes broadcasts on September 8, the station became a full-time affiliate of the TUDN Radio network. This continued until 2022.

References

1946 establishments in Mexico
Radio stations established in 1946
Radio stations in Tijuana